K.T.C. Abdullah or Abdullah hails from  Palayam, Kozhikode, Kerala, British India. Born in 1936. He was a veteran actor on stage and performed in a few notable Malayalam films. He died on 17 November 2018 at Kozhikode, Kerala, India. He made his screen debut in 1977 with Ramu Kariat directorial Dweepu. Abdullah went on to act in over 35 films. His last scene was in the critically renowned Sudani from Nigeria in 2018.

Career
As a stage performer, Abdullah worked in a private firm called KTC, later he got the title KTC Abdullah

Filmography

References

External links

Living people
Indian male film actors
Male actors from Kozhikode
People from Kozhikode district
Male actors in Malayalam cinema
21st-century Indian male actors
1936 births